Evenstad is a village in Stor-Elvdal Municipality in Innlandet county, Norway. The small village (it had a population of 77 in 2005 according to StatBank) is surrounded by forests, mountains and lakes. The village is the site of the Evenstad Church.

The Evenstad campus of the Inland Norway University of Applied Sciences is located in the village. This campus is where the Faculty of Forestry and Wilderness Management has about 220 students. It is the smallest campus within the university.

In May 1995, the river Glomma flooded which caused some damage in Evenstad.

References

External links
 INN Evenstad campus
 Norwegian article about the May 1995 flood

Stor-Elvdal
Villages in Innlandet
Populated places on the Glomma River